Alapaha may refer to:

Alapaha, Georgia
Alapaha River
Alapaha Rise, a 1st magnitude spring in Hamilton County, Florida 
Lakeland, Georgia was named Alapaha from 1838 to 1857.